Damme is a town in the district of Vechta, in Lower Saxony, Germany. It is situated right next to lake Dümmer, approximately 25 km south of Vechta, and 36 km northeast of Osnabrück.

Sons and daughters of the town
 John Stallo (1823-1900), German-American-academic, jurist, philosopher and ambassador
 Heinrich Enneking (1855-1947), German politician (center), a member of the Oldenburg Landtag
 Franz Meyer (1882-1945), German politician (center), 1920-1933 member of the Oldenburg Landtag
 Johannes Pohlschneider (1899-1981), 1954-1974 bishop of Aachen
 Theodor Hillenhinrichs (1901-1990), German politician and Member of Landtag (CDU)
 Anton Cromme (1901-1953), chemist and member of parliament (CDU)
 Wolfgang Knabe (born 1959), triple jumper

References

Towns in Lower Saxony
Vechta (district)